The 2002 J&S Cup was a tennis tournament played on clay courts in Warsaw, Poland the event was part of the 2002 WTA Tour. The tournament was held from May 6 to 12, 2002. Henrieta Nagyová was the defending champion, but lost in the final to Elena Bovina of Russia 6–3, 6–1.

Seeds

 Henrieta Nagyová (final)
 Tatiana Poutchek (first round)
 Anna Kournikova (first round)
 Alina Jidkova (first round)
 Virginia Ruano Pascual (quarterfinals)
 Samantha Reeves (second round)
 Jelena Kostanić (first round)
 Stéphanie Foretz (second round)

Draw

Finals

Top half

Bottom half

References

JandS Cup - Singles